Church of Saint Anthony Abbot is a Roman Catholic church in the town of Breno, in the province of Brescia, Lombardy, northern Italy.

The church contains fragments of Frescos on three walls around the chancel by Girolamo Romani in collaboration with Daniele Mori, who also worked with him in Pisogne and Bienno. These frescos of scenes from the "Book of Daniel" are inspired by the grotesque and anti-classical artististic expression that pervades strongly in Valcamonica.

See also
Girolamo Romani

Footnotes

External links

Antonio Abate, Breno